The 1971 Swedish Open was a combined men's and women's tennis tournament played on outdoor clay courts held in Båstad, Sweden. The event was classified as a Group C category tournament and was part of the 1971 Grand Prix circuit. It was the 24th edition of the tournament and was held from 5 July through 11 July 1971. Ilie Năstase and Helga Masthoff won the singles titles.

Finals

Men's singles
 Ilie Năstase defeated  Jan Leschly 6–7, 6–2, 6–1, 6–4

Women's singles
 Helga Masthoff defeated  Ingrid Bentzer 4–6, 6–1, 6–3

Men's doubles
 Ilie Năstase /  Ion Ţiriac defeated  Jaime Pinto-Bravo /  Butch Seewagen 7–6, 6–1

Women's doubles
 Helga Masthoff /  Heide Orth defeated  Ana María Pinto Bravo /  Linda Tuero 6–1, 6–2

References

External links
ITF – Tournament Details

Swedish Open
Swedish Open
Swedish Open
July 1971 sports events in Europe